{{DISPLAYTITLE:List of F4 polytopes}}

In 4-dimensional geometry, there are 9 uniform 4-polytopes with F4 symmetry, and one chiral half symmetry, the snub 24-cell. There is one self-dual regular form, the 24-cell with 24 vertices.

Visualization

Each can be visualized as symmetric orthographic projections in Coxeter planes of the F4 Coxeter group, and other subgroups.

The 3D picture are drawn as Schlegel diagram projections, centered on the cell at pos. 3, with a consistent orientation, and the 5 cells at position 0 are shown solid.

Coordinates 

Vertex coordinates for all 15 forms are given below, including dual configurations from the two regular 24-cells. (The dual configurations are named in bold.) Active rings in the first and second nodes generate points in the first column. Active rings in the third and fourth nodes generate the points in the second column. The sum of each of these points are then permutated by coordinate positions, and sign combinations. This generates all vertex coordinates. Edge lengths are 2.

The only exception is the snub 24-cell, which is generated by half of the coordinate permutations, only an even number of coordinate swaps. φ=(+1)/2.

References

 J.H. Conway and M.J.T. Guy: Four-Dimensional Archimedean Polytopes, Proceedings of the Colloquium on Convexity at Copenhagen, page 38 und 39, 1965 
 John H. Conway, Heidi Burgiel, Chaim Goodman-Strauss, The Symmetries of Things 2008,  (Chapter 26)
 H.S.M. Coxeter:
 H.S.M. Coxeter, Regular Polytopes, 3rd Edition, Dover New York, 1973
 Kaleidoscopes: Selected Writings of H.S.M. Coxeter, edited by F. Arthur Sherk, Peter McMullen, Anthony C. Thompson, Asia Ivic Weiss, Wiley-Interscience Publication, 1995,  Wiley::Kaleidoscopes: Selected Writings of H.S.M. Coxeter
 (Paper 22) H.S.M. Coxeter, Regular and Semi Regular Polytopes I, [Math. Zeit. 46 (1940) 380-407, MR 2,10]
 (Paper 23) H.S.M. Coxeter, Regular and Semi-Regular Polytopes II, [Math. Zeit. 188 (1985) 559-591]
 (Paper 24) H.S.M. Coxeter, Regular and Semi-Regular Polytopes III, [Math. Zeit. 200 (1988) 3-45]
 N.W. Johnson: The Theory of Uniform Polytopes and Honeycombs, Ph.D. Dissertation, University of Toronto, 1966

External links
 
 Uniform, convex polytopes in four dimensions:, Marco Möller  
 

4-polytopes